Xavier Vierge Zafra (born 30 April 1997) is a Spanish motorcycle racer, contracted to race for Honda Racing Corporation in the 2022 Superbike World Championship.

Career

Early career

Born in Barcelona, Vierge was the 2015 FIM CEV Moto2 European Championship runner-up, winning six races, finishing in second three times, and in third place once, out of the eleven races that year.

Moto2 World Championship

Tech 3 Racing (2015–2017)
In the same year, he made his debut in the 2015 Moto2 World Championship as the permanent replacement for Ricard Cardús in the Tech3 team from the tenth round of the season onwards, but failed to score any championship points.

He was retained by the team for the 2016 Moto2 season, where he scored his first Grand Prix points in Argentina and achieved a best result of 8th in Sepang. At the end of the season he collected 37 points, and was awarded the Moto2 Rookie of the Year prize, winning it by one point over Miguel Oliveira.

He stayed with the Tech3 team for the 2017 season, this time partnered by Australian Remy Gardner. At the Italian Grand Prix, Vierge was forced to sit out of the race due to a thoracic trauma following a crash in qualifying. In Assen, Vierge suffered a broken arm in free practice and was again forced to sit out the event. He also had to sit out the next round at Sachsenring and was replaced by Héctor Garzó. At Motegi, Vierge claimed his first podium finish in the championship with a second place finish. He ended the season 11th in the standings, with 98 points.

Dynavolt Intact GP (2018)
On 5 August 2017, it was announced that Vierge would join Dynavolt Intact GP for the 2018 season, partnering Marcel Schrötter, who was also his teammate at Tech3 in the second half of 2015. He took his first pole at Argentina, and finished the race in second place. At Austria, he had a nasty crash in qualifying after a coming together with Steven Odendaal, causing him to miss the race and the next weekend at Silverstone. He would grab a podium with his third place finish at Phillip Island, and finish the season in 11th again, with 131 points.

EG 0,0 Marc VDS (2019)
On 22 August 2018, it was confirmed that Vierge would sign for EG 0,0 Marc VDS for the 2019 season, partnering Álex Márquez, the younger brother of Marc Márquez. Vierge replaced Joan Mir, who moved up to MotoGP with Suzuki. His place at Dynavolt Intact GP was taken by Thomas Lüthi, who returned to Moto2 after one season in the premier class. In the opening race in Qatar, also the first race with the new Triumph 765cc triple engines, Vierge qualified in second, took the lead at the start, but then fell back to tenth place by the end of the race. In the next race in Argentina, Vierge took pole position for the second consecutive season, however a problem on the warm-up lap meant he could not start the race. His bad luck continued at Austin, when he was involved in a first-lap crash at turn one along with Fabio Di Giannantonio and Joe Roberts. His unlucky season continued throughout the whole year, his best result being a 4th place finish, and Vierge only finished 13th in the standings, collecting 81 points.

Petronas Sprinta Racing (2020–2021)
After a disappointing 2019, Vierge moved on to the Sepang Racing Team for the 2020 season, partnering with Jake Dixon. Vierge once again had an underwhelming season, with no podium finishes, a 4th place being his best in Rimini, and one pole position, which he achieved at Catalunya. He finished the season 10th in the standings with 79 points, but 35 points ahead of Dixon.

Vierge stayed with Sepang Racing Team for the 2021 season, once again partnering Jake Dixon. He had one podium finish during the season, a 3rd place from Catalunya, and finished 11th in the standings again, with 93 points.

Superbike World Championship
In September, Vierge and Honda announced that he would be competing in the Superbike World Championship for 2022, replacing Leon Haslam. He will be partnered by fellow MotoGP outcast Iker Lecuona, on the factory Honda ride.

Career statistics

FIM CEV Moto3 Junior World Championship

Races by year
(key) (Races in bold indicate pole position, races in italics indicate fastest lap)

FIM CEV Moto2 European Championship

Races by year
(key) (Races in bold indicate pole position, races in italics indicate fastest lap)

Grand Prix motorcycle racing

By season

By class

Races by year

(key) (Races in bold indicate pole position, races in italics indicate fastest lap)

Superbike World Championship

By season

Races by year
(key) (Races in bold indicate pole position) (Races in italics indicate fastest lap)

* Season still in progress.

References

External links

1997 births
Living people
Spanish motorcycle racers
Motorcycle racers from Catalonia
Moto2 World Championship riders
Sportspeople from Barcelona
Superbike World Championship riders